Genesee (formerly, Geneseo) is an unincorporated community in Plumas County, California. It lies at an elevation of 3701 feet (1128 m). It is named for the one of the several places in New York named Genesee or Geneseo.

The Geneseo post office operated from 1865 to 1868, and again from 1880 to 1940.

Local legends sometimes use Genesee as a location for ghost stories.

References

Unincorporated communities in California
Unincorporated communities in Plumas County, California